Sebastian Russo (15 November 1924 – 27 February 1981) was a primary care physician from Baltimore, Maryland. He was murdered in his office in February 1981, and his case remains unsolved. After his death, he was declared "the last of the $5 doctors" in Baltimore, referring to his tendency to charge patients $5 or less for his services.

Life and career
Russo was born on 15 November 1924 in Sicily, Italy. He attended university in his native country and was later certified as a doctor in the United States. Russo emigrated from Italy to the United States in the 1950s. He and his wife Mary had one daughter, Rosann.

In 1959, Russo established a medical practice on Harford Road in the Hamilton area of Northeast Baltimore. He was described as an old-fashioned family doctor who worked long hours, charged $5 or less for his services, and did not have a nurse or secretary. Local residents further described Russo as a "compassionate physician" and "almost like a saint" because of the quality of care they received from him.

Death and investigation
On 27 February 1981, a neighbor heard a noise from Russo's office and called the Baltimore Police Department. Officers arrived at the scene shortly after 9:30pm and found Russo dead. He was lying on his back and had been shot once in the upper left chest. His keys were on the floor next to him, and the door to a drug cabinet had been left open. Detectives suspected at the time that Russo's murderer had been searching for drugs.

Other patients told police that a man came into Russo's office on the evening of the murder, left, returned a few minutes later, and waited an hour to be seen. The witnesses stated that when they left, the man and another woman were still in the office, but it was unclear if the two were together. No other details about the suspected murderer have ever been found, and the case remains unsolved. One local detective called Russo's murder "the toughest case I've ever been on".

Legacy

On 2 March 1981, about 400 mourners held a candlelight vigil and procession outside of Russo's office. About 700 residents attended his funeral the next day.

In September 1983, a wrought iron clock was erected in the Hamilton area to honor Russo's memory. The clock was paid for with city funds and with a unclaimed reward fund raised for information leading to Russo's murderer. The clock stands today at the southwest corner of Harford Road and Hamilton Avenue in the Hamilton Hills neighborhood, three blocks northeast of Russo's former office.

In 2007, the Baltimore City Health Department created the Dr. Sebastian Russo Award. The award recognized local health care providers who offered "dedicated and compassionate service to low-income individuals and families".

See also
 Lists of unsolved murders
 List of unsolved murders (1980–1999)

References

External links
 

1981 murders in the United States
Unsolved murders in the United States
1924 births
1981 deaths